"Sleepy-Eyed John" is a song that was a million-selling hit for Johnny Horton in 1961.

Overview
Written by left-handed fiddle player Tex Atchison, the song was first recorded in a Western swing style by Ole Rasmussen for Capitol Records in 1950, when Atchison played in Rasmussen's band, the Nebraska Cornhuskers, as they toured California. Billboard reviewed the 10-inch 78 rpm single, calling it a "real toe-tapper" appropriate for square dancing, with a "pert" vocal performance by Ted Wilds. Atchison may have based the song on a traditional Kentucky bluegrass tune known as "Get Up, John" or "Sleepy John".

The song's name was taken as the moniker of radio disc jockey John Lepley, who went by Sleepy-Eyed John. In the mid-1950s, Lepley held down the afternoon slot at Memphis station WHHM, and he promoted musical acts at a local entertainment complex called Clearpool, featuring Western swing bands at the Eagle's Nest stage. Lepley booked Elvis Presley to perform in 1954 – these early appearances helped Presley establish a fan base and his personal style.

Atchison's song saw its biggest success with Johnny Horton. Aided by a famous B-side – Horton's version of Hank Williams' "They'll Never Take Her Love from Me" – the 45 rpm record debuted on Billboards Country and Western chart in late April 1961, rising to number 9, and staying on the chart for eight weeks.

A few months later, expatriate Tennessee country singer Johnny Duncan released a single of "Sleepy-Eyed John" on the Pye label in the UK, backed by his veteran UK band, the Blue Grass Boys. The flipside was another Atchison/Rasmussen tune: "I'm Still Bettin' on Love".

In 1972, the song was recorded by the Norwegian bluegrass group Christiania Fusel & Blaagress. The lyrics were translated into the Norwegian language to describe an eccentric villager with a wooden leg.

In the late 1990s, Bear Family Records issued a retrospective set of Rasmussen songs on Compact disc, the set titled Sleepy-Eyed John. The recordings were made during 1950–1952 when Rasmussen was signed to Capitol Records.

References

1950 singles
1961 singles
Bluegrass songs
Capitol Records singles
Columbia Records singles
Johnny Horton songs
Pye Records singles
Western swing songs